Westhope, also known as the Richard Lloyd Jones House, is a Frank Lloyd Wright designed Textile Block home that was constructed in Tulsa, Oklahoma in 1929. This was Wright's only Textile Block house outside of California.  The client, Richard Lloyd Jones, was Wright's cousin and the publisher of the Tulsa Tribune.

This building is located at 3700 South Birmingham Avenue. It was listed in the National Register on April 10, 1975. It was listed under National Register Criteria C, g, and its NRIS number is 75001575.

Westhope is the location of a frequently-quoted anecdote about Wright: Richard Lloyd Jones called Wright in the middle of a storm to complain that the roof was leaking on his desk, and Wright replied, "Richard, why don't you move your desk?"  But Jones’ wife Georgia had an equally memorable perspective regarding the leaking structure:  she said, “This is what we get for leaving a work of art out in the rain.”

As of mid-2017, the owner of the house was Barbara Tyson, a member of the family that founded Tyson Foods Inc.
"Local commercial real estate developer Stuart Price recently bought the unique block and glass home, 3704 S. Birmingham Ave., from Bat, LLC, an Arkansas limited liability company, for $2.5 million, Tulsa County land records show."

References

 Storrer, William Allin. The Frank Lloyd Wright Companion. University Of Chicago Press, 2006,  (S.227)

External links
Westhope on peterbeers.net
Photos of Westhope on galenfrysinger.com
Westhope on exploringart.net
Photos of Westhope on Flickr

Westhope on steinrag.com
Richard Lloyd Jones bio on Unitarian Universalist Association of Congregations

Frank Lloyd Wright buildings
Houses on the National Register of Historic Places in Oklahoma
Houses completed in 1929
Buildings and structures in Tulsa, Oklahoma
Houses in Tulsa County, Oklahoma
National Register of Historic Places in Tulsa, Oklahoma